Bahuara is a village in Kamsaar in the Indian state of Uttar Pradesh. Bahuara is a small village with a population of almost 5000. It is surrounded by others Kamsar villages. Bahuara is well connected with the town of Dildarnagar which is hardly 2-3 kilometres away from the village.
People of Bahuara are scattered throughout the world. Ancestrally, the people of bahuara have been a land-owning (Zamindar) community divided into two colonies Westside & Eastside. Neighbouring villages are Rakhsaha, Dildarnagar, and others.

History

Bahuwara village was founded by Zamindar Naseer khan in 1590 AD, who was a grand son of Narhar khan founder of Dildarnagar kamsar. Naseer Khan had two sons who established West side and East Side in the village. Later their family established some hamlets and Muhallahs in and near the village. When Naseer Khan established the village he also build a Eid Gah in the village in 1600. Later his descendants made one more Eid Gah in the village known as Qasmi Eid gah. Know the Eid Gah made by Zamindar Naseer Khan is known as Purana Eid Gah.

Agriculture 

In terms of agriculture, Bahuara stands on a good position. The soil of the village is full of minerals. Most of the families in the village belong to zamindar community. People are doing farming in the village for more than three hundred years and are very much skild. The total area of that village is 634.94 acres out of which nearly 600 acres of land is crop production area of the village. Crops which grow in Gazipur district are grown in the village. The village machinery like tractors and combine harvesters are used for farming. Mostly mustard, wheat, rice farming is done in the village. Rice is one of the main crops in the region. Rice farming is done two times in a year, if the rainfall is good then it is done three times.

Histrorical Population

References 

Cities and towns in Ghazipur district